Potamotyphlus kaupii (also known as Kaup's caecilian) is a species of amphibian in the family Typhlonectidae. It is monotypic within the genus Potamotyphlus. It is found widely in the Amazon Basin and The Guianas in South America.

Their most common causes of death are dermatitis and skin lesions. The chytrid fungus Batrachochytrium dendrobatidis, can also threaten them, as it does to many other amphibian biodiversity all over the world.

References

Typhlonectidae
Monotypic amphibian genera
Amphibians of Brazil
Amphibians of Colombia
Amphibians of Ecuador
Amphibians of Peru
Amphibians of Venezuela
Amphibians described in 1859
Taxonomy articles created by Polbot